The TOJ SC03 is a 2-liter sports prototype race car, designed, developed and built by German racing team and constructor, Team Obermoser Jörg; constructed to the FIA's Group 5 category and specification of racing, specifically the European 2-Litre Sportscar Championship, in 1975. Its career spanned 5 years (1975-1979), and in that period of time, it won a total of 3 races, and scored 9 podium finishes; as well as one pole position. It was powered by a naturally-aspirated  BMW M12/7 four-cylinder engine; producing .

References

Sports prototypes
24 Hours of Le Mans race cars